TRPM6 is a transient receptor potential ion channel associated with hypomagnesemia with secondary hypocalcemia.

See also
 TRPM
 Ruthenium red

References

Further reading

External links
 

Ion channels